Yvann Maçon (born 1 October 1998) is a French professional footballer who plays as a right-back for  club Paris FC on loan from Saint-Étienne.

Club career

Dunkerque
Maçon was born in Baie-Mahault on Guadeloupe, and began his senior career with Dunkerque in the Championnat National. In the 2019–20 season, he made his breakthrough and was part of the team winning promotion to the Ligue 2.

Saint-Étienne
On 31 January 2020, Maçon signed a professional contract with Saint-Étienne. He made his professional debut for the club in a 1–0 Ligue 1 loss to Montpellier on 9 February 2020.

Maçon began making an impact at the start of the 2020–21 season, particularly on 27 September 2020 against Marseille, providing the assist for the first goal and impressing with his defensive efforts, in what was Saint-Étienne's first victory in Marseille since 1979. On 20 September, the week prior, Maçon had scored his first goal for Saint-Étienne against Nantes in a 2–2 draw. He suffered a posterior cruciate ligament injury on 12 October in a match against Slovakia for France U21, which effectively ruled him out for the remainder of the season.

Maçon returned to action on the first matchday of the 2021–22 season, starting at right-back in a 1–1 draw against Lorient.

Loan to Paris FC
On 8 December 2022, Maçon signed for Paris FC on loan until the end of the 2022–23 season.

International career
Maçon represented the Guadeloupe U20 for 2017 CONCACAF U-20 Championship qualifying in 2016, scoring a hattrick in his last game with them.

He made his debut for the France U21 team on 8 October 2020 against Liechtenstein.

Career statistics

Honours 
Saint-Étienne
 Coupe de France runner-up: 2019–20

References

External links
Yvann Maçon at FFF
Yvann Maçon at AS Saint-Étienne

1998 births
Living people
People from Baie-Mahault
French footballers
France youth international footballers
Guadeloupean footballers
French people of Guadeloupean descent
Association football fullbacks
Ligue 1 players
Ligue 2 players
Championnat National players
Championnat National 3 players
Castelnau Le Crès FC players
USL Dunkerque players
AS Saint-Étienne players
Paris FC players
Guadeloupe youth international footballers
Black French sportspeople